is a passenger railway station in the city of Tōon, Ehime Prefecture, Japan.  It is operated by the private transportation company Iyotetsu.

Lines
During most of the day, trains arrive every fifteen minutes. Trains continue from Matsuyama City Station on the Takahama Line to Takahama Station.

Layout
The station consists of a single dead-headed side platform.

History
The station was opened on October 4, 1899

Surrounding area
 Toon Municipal Kitayoshii Elementary School
Ehime University School of Medicine
 Ehime University Hospital

See also
 List of railway stations in Japan

References

External links

Iyotetsu official station information

Iyotetsu Yokogawara Line
Railway stations in Ehime Prefecture
Railway stations in Japan opened in 1899
Tōon, Ehime